Royal Thai Army Football Club (Thai: สโมสรฟุตบอลทหารบก) 
is a Thailand football club under the stewardship of Royal Thai Army based in Bangkok. The team plays their home matches at Thai Army Sports Stadium. The club is currently playing in the Thai League 3 Bangkok metropolitan region.

Prior to 2015 the club was called "Army Welfare Department F.C.". After it was promoted from winner Khǒr Royal Cup to Regional League Division 2, the club changed its name to Royal Thai Army F.C..

Stadium and locations by season records

Season by season record

P = Played
W = Games won
D = Games drawn
L = Games lost
F = Goals for
A = Goals against
Pts = Points
Pos = Final position

QR1 = First Qualifying Round
QR2 = Second Qualifying Round
R1 = Round 1
R2 = Round 2
R3 = Round 3
R4 = Round 4

R5 = Round 5
R6 = Round 6
QF = Quarter-finals
SF = Semi-finals
RU = Runners-up
W = Winners

Players

Current squad

Honours
 Khǒr Royal Cup
 Winner : 2014

References

External links
 

 
Association football clubs established in 2011
Football clubs in Thailand
Pathum Thani province
2011 establishments in Thailand
Military association football clubs in Thailand